Caesar Kunikov (BDK-64) is a Project 775 (NATO reporting name: Ropucha-I-class) large landing ship (Bol'shoy Desatnyy Korabl) of the Russian Navy. She is named after Caesar Lvovich Kunikov, the commanding officer of a landing party that captured the beach-head of Malaya Zemlya, a Hero of the Soviet Union.

The ship was built at the Stocznia Północna shipyard in Gdańsk, Poland, and launched on 30 October 1986.

She is currently in service with Black Sea Fleet's 197th Landing Ship Brigade, of the 30th Division of Surface Ships, and homeported in Sevastopol. She is under the patronage of the city of Zelenograd (since 1998) and Chelyabinsk Oblast (since 2011).

Service history

Syrian civil war 
In October 2015, Caesar Kunikov was sent to Syria with a cargo of weapons and ammunition for the Syrian Arab Army.

Russo-Ukrainian War 
On 24 March 2022 the General Staff of the Ukrainian Armed Forces reported that Caesar Kunikov and its sister ship Novocherkassk had been damaged during an attack that destroyed the  Saratov in the port of Berdiansk during the 2022 Russian invasion of Ukraine. Video of the incident shows two  warships, possibly the sister ships Caesar Kunikov and Novocherkassk, retreating from the port soon after the attack; one of the retreating ships' forecastles was on fire, although it is unclear which.

On 18 April 2022 it was reported that the ship's commander, Captain of the 3rd rank Alexander Chirva, died during the invasion of Ukraine.

On 24 August 2022 it was reported Caesar Kunikov and sister ship Novocherkassk were out of action due to lack of spare parts to repair the ships. The lack of spare parts was attributed to the sanctions imposed on Russia.

References

External links
 
  Photographs of Caesar Kunikov.
 

1986 ships
Amphibious warfare vessels of the Soviet Navy
Amphibious warfare vessels of the Russian Navy
Cold War amphibious warfare vessels of the Soviet Union
Ships built in Gdańsk
Naval ships built in Poland for export
Ropucha-class landing ships
Ships involved in the 2022 Russian invasion of Ukraine